This is a list of seaside resorts in South Africa. These seaside resorts are in the Eastern Cape,  KwaZulu-Natal, Northern Cape and Western Cape provinces which are all coastal provinces of South Africa.

Eastern Cape 
 Blue Horizon Bay
 Bluewater Bay
 Bushman's River Mouth
 Cannon Rocks
 Cape St Francis
Chintsa
Coffee Bay
East London
Gonubie 
Haga Haga
Hamburg
Jeffreys Bay 
Kenton-on-Sea
Kidd's Beach 
Mazeppa Bay
Morgans Bay 
Port Alfred
Port Elizabeth
Port St Johns 
St Francis Bay

KwaZulu-Natal 
 Amanzimtoti
 Ballito
 Blythedale Beach
 Cape Vidal
Durban
eMdloti
Hibberdene
Kingsburgh 
Margate
Mtunzini 
Pennington 
Port Edward 
Ramsgate 
Salt Rock 
Scottburgh 
Shaka's Rock 
Shelly Beach 
St Michael's-on-sea 
St Lucia
Tinley Manor
Tugela Mouth
uMhlanga
Umzumbe
Uvongo
Zinkwazi Beach

Northern Cape 
 Alexander Bay
Hondeklip Bay
Jacobsbaai
Kleinzee
Port Nolloth

Western Cape 
 Arniston
 Betty's Bay
 Bloubergstrand
 Boknesstrand
 Brenton-on-Sea
 Buffelsbaai
 Cape Town
 De Kelders
 Elands Bay
 Fish Hoek
 Franskraalstrand
 Gansbaai
 Gordon's Bay
Hartenbos 
 Hawston
 Hermanus
 Herolds Bay
 Keurboomstrand
 Kleinmond
 Knysna
 Kommetjie
 L'Agulhas
 Lambert's Bay
 Langebaan
 Llandudno
 Mossel Bay
 Muizenberg
 Nature's Valley
 Noordhoek
 Onrus
 Paternoster
 Pearly Beach
 Plettenberg Bay
 Pringle Bay
 Sedgefield
 Simon's Town
 St Helena Bay
 Stilbaai
 Strand
 Strandfontein
 Struisbaai
 Tergniet
 Victoria Bay
 Wilderness
 Witsand
 Yzerfontein

References 

 
 
 
 
 
 
 
 
 
 
 
 
 
 
 
 
 
 
 
 
 

Lists of tourist attractions in South Africa
Resorts in South Africa